The 1995 South Asian Gold Cup (also known as Bristoi Saaro Gold Cup) was held in Colombo, Sri Lanka between 25 March and 2 April. Originally 6 teams participated in the competition, but Maldives withdrew from the competition.

Venue

Squads

Group stage

Group A

Group B

Knockout phase

Semi-finals

Final

Champion

References

1995
1995 in Sri Lankan sport
1995 in Asian football
International sports competitions hosted by Sri Lanka
20th century in Colombo